Zeuxippus is a genus of Asian jumping spiders that was first described by Tamerlan Thorell in 1891. They look similar to members of Rhene, but their abdomen is longer, more obtuse, and thinner. In addition, the first pair of legs is thicker than the others.

Species
 it contains four species, found in Asia:
Zeuxippus atellanus Thorell, 1895 – Myanmar
Zeuxippus histrio Thorell, 1891 (type) – India
Zeuxippus pallidus Thorell, 1895 – Bangladesh, Myanmar, China, Vietnam
Zeuxippus yunnanensis Peng & Xie, 1995 – China

References

Salticidae
Salticidae genera
Spiders of Asia
Taxa named by Tamerlan Thorell